Orthoraphis is a genus of moths of the family Crambidae described by George Hampson in 1896. The genus was recently transferred from the subfamily Spilomelinae to Lathrotelinae.

Species
Orthoraphis metasticta Hampson, 1899
Orthoraphis obfuscata (Hampson, 1893)
Orthoraphis paula West, 1931
Orthoraphis striatalis Hampson, 1916

References

Crambidae genera
Taxa named by George Hampson